Anguran District is in Mahneshan County, Zanjan province, Iran. At the 2006 National Census, its population was 17,799 in 4,047 households. The following census in 2011 counted 17,290 people in 5,073 households. At the latest census in 2016, the district had 17,164 inhabitants in 5,213 households.

References 

Mahneshan County

Districts of Zanjan Province

Populated places in Zanjan Province

Populated places in Mahneshan County